The 2008–09 UCI Asia Tour was the 5th season of the UCI Asia Tour. The season began on 4 October 2008 with the Tour of Milad du Nour and ended on 13 September 2009 with the Tour de Hokkaido.

The points leader, based on the cumulative results of previous races, wears the UCI Asia Tour cycling jersey. Hossein Askari from Iran was the defending champion of the 2007–08 UCI Asia Tour. Ghader Mizbani of Iran was crowned as the 2008–09 UCI Asia Tour champion.

Throughout the season, points are awarded to the top finishers of stages within stage races and the final general classification standings of each of the stages races and one-day events. The quality and complexity of a race also determines how many points are awarded to the top finishers, the higher the UCI rating of a race, the more points are awarded.

The UCI ratings from highest to lowest are as follows:
 Multi-day events: 2.HC, 2.1 and 2.2 
 One-day events: 1.HC, 1.1 and 1.2

Events

2008

2009

Final standings

Individual classification

Team classification

Nation classification

Nation under-23 classification

External links
 

UCI Asia Tour
2009 in road cycling
2008 in road cycling
UCI
UCI